USS Widgeon was the name of more than one vessel of the U.S. Navy:

 , a minesweeper in commission from 1918 to 1922 and from 1923 to 1947 that saw service in World War I and World War II.
 , a minesweeper in commission from 1955 to 1969 that saw service in the Vietnam War.

See also
 , which served as the fishery patrol boat Widgeon in the fleets of the United States Bureau of Fisheries and Fish and Wildlife Service from 1919 to 1944

References

United States Navy ship names